This is a list of years in New Zealand television.

Twenty-first century

Twentieth century

See also 
 List of years in New Zealand
 List of years in television

Television
Television in New Zealand by year
New Zealand